The Sony Xperia 10 and Sony Xperia 10 Plus are Android smartphones marketed and manufactured by Sony. Part of Sony's midrange Xperia series, they were unveiled at the annual Mobile World Congress event on February 25, 2019 alongside the Xperia L3 and Xperia 1.

Design
The Xperia 10 and Xperia 10 Plus have a polycarbonate unibody construction, with Corning Gorilla Glass 5 protecting the screen. The screen has asymmetrical bezels, with the top bezel housing the earpiece, front-facing camera, notification LED and various sensors. The fingerprint sensor and power and volume buttons are located on the right side of the device, while the 3.5mm headphone jack is located on the top; the card slot is located on the left side. The rear cameras are centered and located near the top of the phone, with the LED flash above. The bottom edge has the primary microphone and a downward-firing speaker next to the USB-C port. Four colors are available, three of which are shared: Black, Navy and Silver. The fourth color is unique, Pink for the 10 and Gold for the 10 Plus.

Specifications

Hardware
The Xperia 10 is powered by the Qualcomm Snapdragon 630 SoC and the Adreno 508 GPU, while the Xperia 10 Plus is powered by the Qualcomm Snapdragon 636 SoC and the Adreno 509 GPU. Both have a single storage option, 64 GB of eMMC. The 10 is available with 3 GB of RAM (or 4 GB of RAM for China); the 10 Plus is available with 4 GB of RAM (or 6 GB of RAM for China). MicroSD card expansion on is supported on both models up to 512 GB with a single-SIM or hybrid dual-SIM setup. The display is a 21:9 1080p (1080 × 2520) IPS LCD panel. The 10 and 10 Plus have 6-inch (152mm) and 6.5-inch (165mm) screens respectively, with a pixel density of 457 ppi and 422 ppi. Both phones support fast charging at 18 W over USB-C. The battery size is 2870mAh for the 10 and 3000mAh for the 10 Plus. A dual camera setup is present on the rear. The 10 has a 13 MP primary lens with PDAF and a 5 MP depth sensor. The 10 Plus has a 12 MP primary lens and an 8 MP telephoto lens, both of which have PDAF. The front-facing camera on both has an 8 MP sensor.

Software
The Xperia 10 and Xperia 10 Plus launched with Android 9.0 "Pie", but were upgraded to Android 10 in May 2020.

Both can also run Sailfish OS and are devices officially supported by Jolla.

References

Android (operating system) devices
Sony smartphones
Mobile phones introduced in 2019
Mobile phones with multiple rear cameras
Mobile phones with 4K video recording